Carex sodiroi is a species of sedge known from a single collection made by Luis Sodiro at some time before 1886. The holotype was deposited in the Berlin herbarium, where it may have been destroyed in the Second World War; if there are no isotypes in Ecuador, then the only record of the species may be a photograph in the Field Museum in Chicago.

References

sodiroi
Flora of Ecuador
Data deficient plants
Plants described in 1904
Taxonomy articles created by Polbot